Whitefish or white fish may refer to:

 Whitefish (fisheries term), referring to the flesh of many types of fishes

Aquatic life

Fish species are 
 Cape whitefish, Pseudobarbus capensis, a cyprinid
 Beluga sturgeon, Huso huso
 Caspian kutum, also called "White Fish" or "Caspian White Fish"
 The chimaerae species:
 Australian ghost shark
 Ogilby's ghostshark
 Freshwater whitefish, members of the subfamily Coregoninae in the family Salmonidae, including:
 Atlantic whitefish, Coregonus huntsmani in the genus Coregonus
 Common whitefish, Coregonus lavaretus in the genus Coregonus
 Lake whitefish, Coregonus clupeaformis in the genus Coregonus
 Mountain whitefish, Prosopium williamsoni, in the genus Prosopium
 Some tilefishes, including
 Ocean whitefish (Caulolatilus princeps)
 White steenbras, (Lithognathus lithognathus), a sparid

Mammals 
 Beluga whale, Delphinapterus leucas

Places 
 Whitefish, Montana
 Whitefish, Ontario
 Whitefish Bay, a bay in Lake Superior between the United States and Canada
 Whitefish Bay, Wisconsin
 Whitefish Falls, Ontario
 Whitefish Lake First Nation, Ontario
 Whitefish Range, Montana and British Columbia
 Whitefish Township, Michigan

Other uses 
"Whitefish", an instrumental by the rock band Yes, first released on the 1985 live album 9012Live: The Solos

See also 
Whitefish Bay (disambiguation)
Whitefish Lake (disambiguation)
Whiting
Whitefish Energy

Animal common name disambiguation pages